Gustavo Balvorín (born 6 September 1977 in San Miguel de Tucumán) is an Argentine football forward who plays for Villa San Antonio.

Career 
Balvorín finished the Apertura 2006 tournament as Gimnasia y Esgrima de Jujuy's top scorer with 7 goals in 17 games, prompting his transfer to Vélez.

In 2008, he joined Lanús and on 1 April 2009 Balvorin and Lanus have mutually agreed to terminate the player's contract. The striker joined Lanus last year.

Balvorin signed with Huracan for the 2010 Clausura tournament. For the 2010-11 season, Balvorín returned to Gimnasia y Esgrima de Jujuy.

References

External links
 Argentine Primera statistics
Statistics at Football-Lineups

Gustavo Balvorín at BDFA 

1977 births
Living people
Argentine footballers
Association football forwards
Argentine Primera División players
Torneo Federal A players
Super League Greece players
Atlético Tucumán footballers
Gimnasia y Esgrima de Jujuy footballers
Club Atlético Vélez Sarsfield footballers
Aldosivi footballers
Club Atlético Lanús footballers
Barcelona S.C. footballers
Levadiakos F.C. players
Club Atlético Huracán footballers
Club Atlético Platense footballers
San Martín de Tucumán footballers
Juventud Antoniana footballers
Argentine expatriate footballers
Sportspeople from San Miguel de Tucumán
Expatriate footballers in Ecuador
Expatriate footballers in Greece
Argentine expatriate sportspeople in Ecuador
Argentine expatriate sportspeople in Greece